Pyle is a surname. Notable people with the surname include: 
 Andrew Pyle (philosopher) (born 1955), British philosopher
 Andrew Pyle (economist) (born 1963), Canadian economist
 Artimus Pyle (born 1948), drummer for the rock & roll group Lynyrd Skynyrd
 Barry Pyle (born 1965), American political scientist
 Christopher Pyle (born 1939), American professor of politics
 David Pyle (1936–2002), English footballer
 Denver Pyle (1920–1997), American actor
 Don Pyle, Canadian record producer
 Elijah Pyle (1918–2009), English professional footballer
 Ellen Bernard Thompson Pyle (1876–1936), American illustrator
 Ernie Pyle (1900–1945), Pulitzer Prize-winning journalist
 Gladys Pyle (1890–1989), South Dakota politician
 Howard Pyle (1853–1911), American illustrator and writer
 John A. Pyle, British atmospheric scientist
 John Howard Pyle (1906–1987), 12th governor of Arizona
 Katharine Pyle, (1863–1938), American author, poet, and illustrator
 Katy Pyle, American dancer and choreographer
 Kenneth B. Pyle, Historian and professor history
 Mamie Shields Pyle, (1866–1949) American suffragist
 Mike Pyle (American football) (1939–2015), American football player with the Chicago Bears (1961–1969)
 Mike Pyle (fighter) (born 1975), American mixed martial arts fighter
 Missi Pyle (born 1972), American actress
 Nancy Pyle, American politician
 Nathan W. Pyle, American cartoonist
 Pip Pyle (1950–2006), English drummer
 Richard Pyle, diving marine biologist
 Richard Pyle (reporter), AP Saigon bureau chief during the Vietnam War
 Robert Michael Pyle (born 1947), American naturalist
Steve Pyle, American cyclist
Steve Pyle (footballer) (born 1963), English footballer

Fictional characters
 Alden Pyle, fictional character from the novel The Quiet American by Graham Greene
 Gomer Pyle, fictional character from the sitcom The Andy Griffith Show
 Goober Pyle, fictional character from the sitcom The Andy Griffith Show

See also
 Pyle, Wales
 Pile (disambiguation)
 Pile (surname), a similar surname
 Pyles, a similar surname